Ascendance may refer to:

 Ascendance (novel), a novel by R.A. Salvatore
 Ascendance Records, an independent record label based in the UK
 The Ascendance Trilogy, a series of novels by Jennifer A. Nielsen

See also
 Ascendancy (disambiguation)
 Ascendency, a quantitative attribute of an ecosystem